Kosorowice  is a village in the administrative district of Gmina Tarnów Opolski, within Opole County, Opole Voivodeship, in south-western Poland.

The village has an approximate population of 800. It is officially bilingual in both Polish and German.

References

Kosorowice